W. R. Berkley Corporation is a commercial lines property & casualty insurance holding company organized in Delaware and based in Greenwich, Connecticut.

The company operates commercial insurance businesses in the United Kingdom, Continental Europe, South America, Canada, Mexico, Scandinavia, Asia and Australia and reinsurance businesses in the United States, United Kingdom, Continental Europe, Australia, the Asia-Pacific region and South Africa.

The company is ranked 397th on the Fortune 500.

History

W. R. Berkley Corporation was founded in 1967 by William R. Berkley, who currently serves as Executive Chairman.

In November 1973, the company became a public company via an initial public offering. At that time, the founder owned 23.8% of the company.

In 1994, the company acquired Key Risk Management Services Inc.

In 1995, the company acquired the remaining 40% interest in Signet Star from Gen Re. The company also acquired MECC for $138 million.

In August 2006, the company acquired Garnet Captive Services LLC, a San Francisco insurance brokerage and alternative risk consulting firm.

On October 31, 2015, Mr. Berkley's son, W. Robert Berkley, Jr., became President and CEO.

References

External links

Insurance companies of the United States
Reinsurance companies
Companies listed on the New York Stock Exchange
Companies based in Greenwich, Connecticut
Financial services companies established in 1967
American companies established in 1967
1967 establishments in Connecticut
1970s initial public offerings
Greenwich, Connecticut